The Oneida Community was a perfectionist religious communal society founded by John Humphrey Noyes and his followers in 1848 near Oneida, New York. The community believed that Jesus had already returned in AD 70, making it possible for them to bring about Jesus's millennial kingdom themselves, and be perfect and free of sin in this world, not just in Heaven (a belief called perfectionism). The Oneida Community practiced communalism (in the sense of communal property and possessions), group marriage, male sexual continence, and mutual criticism.

The community's original 87 members grew to 172 by February 1850, 208 by 1852, and 306 by 1878. There were smaller Noyesian communities in Wallingford, Connecticut; Newark, New Jersey; Putney and Cambridge, Vermont. The branches were closed in 1854 except for the Wallingford branch, which operated until the 1878 tornado devastated it.

The Oneida Community dissolved in 1881, converting itself to a joint-stock company. This eventually became the silverware company Oneida Limited.

Structure 

Even though the community only reached a maximum population of about 300, it had a complex bureaucracy of 27 standing committees and 48 administrative sections.

All community members were expected to work, each according to their abilities. Women tended to do many of the domestic duties. Although more skilled jobs tended to remain with an individual member (the financial manager, for example, held his post throughout the life of the community), community members rotated through the more unskilled jobs, working in the house, the fields, or the various industries. As Oneida thrived, it also began to hire outsiders to work in these positions. They were a major employer in the area, with approximately 200 employees by 1870.

Secondary industries included manufacturing leather travel bags, weaving palm frond hats, construction of rustic garden furniture, game traps, and tourism. Silverware manufacturing began in 1877, relatively late in the community's life, and still exists.

Complex marriage 

The Oneida community strongly believed in a system of free love – a term which Noyes is credited with coining – which was known as complex marriage, where any member was free to have sex with any other who consented. Possessiveness and exclusive relationships were frowned upon.

Noyes developed a distinction between amative and propagative love.

Women over 40 were to act as sexual "mentors" to adolescent boys because these relationships had a minimal chance of conceiving. Furthermore, these women became religious role models for the young men. Likewise, older men often introduced young women to sex. Noyes often used his judgment in determining the partnerships that would form, and he would often encourage relationships between the non-devout and the devout in the community in the hope that the attitudes and behaviors of the devout would influence the attitudes of the non-devout.

In 1993, the community archives were made available to scholars for the first time. Contained within the archives was the journal of Tirzah Miller, Noyes' niece, who wrote extensively about her romantic and sexual relations with other members of Oneida.

Mutual criticism 

Every member of the community was subject to criticism by a committee or the community as a whole during a general meeting. The goal was to eliminate undesirable character traits. Various contemporary sources contend that Noyes himself was the subject of criticism, although less often and of probably less severe criticism than the rest of the community. Charles Nordhoff said he had witnessed the criticism of a member he referred to as "Charles", writing the following account of the incident:

Male continence 

The Oneida community enacted a system of male continence or coitus reservatus to control reproduction within it. John Humprey Noyes decided that sexual intercourse served two distinct purposes. In Male Continence, Noyes argues that the method simply "proposes the subordination of the flesh to the spirit, teaching men to seek principally the elevated spiritual pleasures of sexual connection". The primary purpose of male continence was social satisfaction, "to allow the sexes to communicate and express affection for one another". The second purpose was procreation. Of around two hundred adults using male continence as birth control, there were twelve unplanned births within Oneida between 1848 and 1868, indicating that it was a highly effective form of birth control. Young men were introduced to male continence by post-menopausal women, and experienced, older males introduced young women.

Noyes believed that ejaculation "drained men's vitality and led to disease" and pregnancy and childbirth "levied a heavy tax on the vitality of women". Noyes founded male continence to spare his wife, Harriet, from more difficult childbirths after five traumatizing births of which four led to the death of the child. They favored this method of male continence over other methods of birth control because they found it to be natural, healthy, and favorable for the development of intimate relationships. Women found increased sexual satisfaction in the practice, and Oneida is regarded as highly unusual in the value they placed on women's sexual satisfaction. If a male failed, he faced public disapproval or private rejection.

It is unclear whether the practice of male continence led to significant problems. Sociologist Lawrence Foster sees hints in Noyes' letters indicating that masturbation and anti-social withdrawal from community life may have been issues. Oneida's practice of male continence did not lead to impotence.

Stirpiculture 

Stirpiculture was a proto-eugenics program of selective controlled reproduction within the community devised by Noyes and implemented in 1869. It was designed to create more spiritually and physically perfect children. Community members who wished to be parents would go before a committee to be approved and matched based on their spiritual and moral qualities. 53 women and 38 men participated in this program, which necessitated the construction of a new wing of the Oneida Community Mansion House. The experiment yielded 58 children, nine of whom were fathered by Noyes.

Once children were weaned (usually at around the age of one), they were raised communally in the Children's Wing, or South Wing. Their parents were allowed to visit, but the children's department held jurisdiction over raising the offspring. If the department suspected a parent and child were bonding too closely, the community would enforce a period of separation because the group wanted to stop the affection between parents and children. The Children's department had a male and female supervisor to look after children between ages two and twelve. The supervisors made sure the children followed the routine. Dressing, prayers, breakfast, work, school, lunch, work, playtime, supper, prayers, and study, which were "adjusted according to 'age and ability'."

Stirpiculture was the first positive eugenics experiment in the United States, although it was not recognized as such because of the religious framework from which it emerged.

Role of women 

Oneida embodied one of the most radical and institutional efforts to change women's roles and improve female status in 19th-century America. Women gained some freedoms in the commune that they could not get on the outside. Some of these privileges included not having to care for their own children as Oneida had a communal child care system and freedom from unwanted pregnancies with Oneida's male continence practice. In addition, they were able to wear functional, Bloomer-style clothing and maintain short haircuts. Women were able to participate in practically all types of community work.  While domestic duties remained a primarily female responsibility, women were free to explore positions in business and sales, or as artisans or craftspersons, and many did so, particularly in the late 1860s and early 1870s. Last, women actively shaped commune policy, participating in the daily religious and business meetings.

The complex marriage and free love systems practiced at Oneida further acknowledged female status. Through the complex marriage arrangement, women and men had equal freedom in sexual expression and commitment. Indeed, sexual practices at Oneida accepted female sexuality. A woman's right to satisfying sexual experiences was recognized, and women were encouraged to have orgasms. However, a woman's right to refuse a sexual overture was limited depending on the status of the man who made the advance.

Ellen Wayland-Smith, the author of "The Status and Self-Perception of Women in the Oneida Community", said that men and women had roughly equal status in the community. She points out that while both sexes were ultimately subject to Noyes' vision and will, women did not suffer undue oppression.

Interactions with society 

The community experienced freedom from wider society. The previously mentioned unorthodox marital, sexual, and religious practices caused them to face some criticism. However, between the community's beginning in the 1850s until the 1870s, their interactions with broader society were mostly favorable. These are the best-known instances of conflict and peace resolution.

Outside criticism 

In 1870, a "nineteenth century cultural critic" Dr. John B. Ellis wrote a book against Free Love communities that Noyes inspired, including "Individual Sovereigns, Berlin Heights Free Lovers, Spiritualists, Advocates of Woman Suffrage, or Friends of Free Divorce". He saw their joint goal to be ending marriage. Dr. Ellis described this as an attack on the prevailing moral order. Historian Gayle Fischer mentions that Dr. Ellis also criticized Oneida women's clothing as "healthful' uniforms did not rid Oneida women of their 'peculiar air of unhealthiness' — brought on by "sexual excess."

Noyes responded to Ellis' criticism four years later in a pamphlet, Dixon and His Copytists, where he claimed that Dr. John B. Ellis is a pseudonym for a "literary gentleman living in the upper part of the city." Noyes argued that AMS press employed the writer after they read a Philadelphia paper article on the community and saw a chance to profit off sensationalist writing.

Tryphena Hubbard's legal battle 
In Anthony Wonderly's Oneida Utopia, he covers the 1848–1851 Hubbard affair as a moment where a legal conflict almost ended the group, which was only a mere "Association" at the time. Twenty-one-year-old Tryphena Hubbard learned Noyes' ideas about marriage and sex through his manuscript Bible Argument in 1848. She joined the community and became the group's first local convert. Tryphena Hubbard soon married Henry Seymour, a young man in the community.

Early in 1849, Tryphena's father, Noahdiah Hubbard, learned of the Association's open marriages and demanded his daughter's return. Tryphena refused, and for two years, Noahdiah "made a sulking nuisance of himself at the Mansion House."

An 1850 criticism of Tryphena mentioned her "insubordination to the church" and "excess egotism amounting to insanity." There was marriage before the community attempted perfectionism, and Tryphena's husband's supervision over her was increased along with the "disciplinary norms of the day, physical punishment."

In September 1851, Tryphena began displaying signs of mental illness, "crying at night, speaking incoherently, and wandering around."  Seymour went to the Hubbard family to report their daughter's insanity, and both parents were appalled by Seymour's physical violence.

On September 27, 1851, Noahdiah Hubbard lodged assault and battery charges on behalf of his daughter.  Seymour was indicted, and other community members were served arrest warrants as accessories.

The case was settled on November 26, 1851. The community agreed to Tryphena's expenses while she was in the asylum and after her release $125 a year if she was well and $200 a year if she remained unwell. The Hubbards eventually accepted a $350 settlement in lieu of long-term payments. Tryphena Hubbard eventually returned to Henry Seymour and had a child by him. She died at the age of 49 in 1877.

Decline 

The community lasted until John Humphrey Noyes attempted to pass leadership to his son, Theodore Noyes. This move was unsuccessful because Theodore was an agnostic and lacked his father's talent for leadership. The move also divided the community, as Communitarian John Tower attempted to wrest control for himself. Towner and a breakaway group eventually moved to California, where they convinced the government to create a new municipality for them, Orange County.

Within the commune, there was a debate about when children should be initiated into sex and by whom. There was also much debate about its practices as a whole. The founding members were aging or deceased, and many younger communitarians desired to enter into exclusive, traditional marriages.

The capstone to all these pressures was the campaign by Professor John Mears of Hamilton College against the community. He called for a protest meeting against the Oneida Community, attended by forty-seven clergy members. John Humphrey Noyes was informed by trusted adviser Myron Kinsley that a warrant for his arrest on charges of statutory rape was imminent. Noyes fled the Oneida Community Mansion House and the country in the middle of a June night in 1879, never to return to the United States. Shortly afterward, he wrote to his followers from Niagara Falls, Ontario, recommending that complex marriage be abandoned.

Complex marriage was abandoned in 1879 following external pressures, and the community soon broke apart, with some of the members reorganizing as a joint-stock company. Marital partners normalized their status with the partners with whom they were cohabiting at the time of the re-organization. Over 70 Community members entered into a traditional marriage in the following year.

During the early 20th century, the new company, Oneida Community Limited, narrowed its focus to silverware. The animal trap business was sold in 1912, the silk business in 1916, and the canning was discontinued as unprofitable in 1915.

In 1947, embarrassed by their progenitor's legacy, Noyes' descendants burned the group's records.

The joint-stock corporation still exists and is a major producer of cutlery under the brand name "Oneida Limited". In September 2004, Oneida Limited announced that it would cease all U.S. manufacturing operations at the beginning of 2005, ending a 124-year tradition. The company continues to design and market products that are manufactured overseas. The company has been selling off its manufacturing facilities. Most recently, the distribution center in Sherrill, New York, was closed. Administrative offices remain in the Oneida area.

The last original member of the community, Ella Florence Underwood (1850–1950), died on June 25, 1950, in Kenwood, New York, near Oneida, New York.

Legacy 

Many histories and first-person accounts of the Oneida Community have been published since the commune dissolved itself. Among those are: The Oneida Community: An Autobiography, 1851–1876 and The Oneida Community: The Breakup, 1876–1881, both by Constance Noyes Robertson; Desire and Duty at Oneida: Tirzah Miller's Intimate Memoir and Special Love/Special Sex: An Oneida Community Diary, both by Robert S. Fogarty; Without Sin by Spencer Klaw; Oneida, From Free Love Utopia to the Well-Set Table by Ellen Wayland-Smith; and biographical/autobiographic accounts by once-members including Jessie Catherine Kinsley, Corinna Ackley Noyes, George Wallingford Noyes, and Pierrepont B. Noyes.

An account of the Oneida Community is found in Sarah Vowell's book Assassination Vacation. It discusses the community in general and the membership of Charles J. Guiteau, for more than five years, in the community. (Guiteau later assassinated President James A. Garfield.)  The perfectionist community in David Flusfeder's novel Pagan House (2007) is directly inspired by the Oneida Community. There is a residential building called "Oneida" at the Twin Oaks Community in Virginia. Twin Oaks, an intentional community,  names its buildings after defunct intentional communities.

Oneida Community Mansion House

The Oneida Community Mansion House was listed as a National Historic Landmark in 1965, and the principal surviving material culture of the Oneida Community consists of those landmarked buildings, object collections, and landscape. The five buildings of the Mansion House, separately designed by Erastus Hamilton, Lewis W. Leeds, and Theodore Skinner, comprise  on a 33-acre site. This site has been continuously occupied since the community's establishment in 1848, and the existing Mansion House has been inhabited since 1862. Today, the Oneida Community Mansion House is a non-profit educational organization chartered by the State of New York. It welcomes visitors throughout the year with guided tours, programs, and exhibits. It preserves, collects, and interprets the intangible and material culture of the Oneida Community and related themes of the 19th and 20th centuries. The Mansion House also houses residential apartments, overnight guest rooms, and meeting spaces.

See also
Christian communism
Eugenic feminism

References

Sources 

 

 Limited preview: 

 Limited preview:

Further reading 

 Limited preview: 

 

 Also

External links 

 Oneida Community Archives at Syracuse University
 Oneida Community Mansion House – a museum of the Oneida Community

Communalism
Free love
Intentional communities in New York (state)
Oneida, New York
Populated places established in 1848
Utopian communities in the United States
Religious belief systems founded in the United States
Polyamory